3578 Carestia, provisional designation , is an extremely dark asteroid from the outer region of the asteroid belt, approximately 58 kilometers in diameter. It was discovered on 11 February 1977, by the staff of the Felix Aguilar Observatory at El Leoncito Complex in San Juan, Argentina. The asteroid was named after South American astronomer Reinaldo Carestia.

Orbit and classification 

Carestia orbits the Sun in the outer main-belt at a distance of 2.5–3.9 AU once every 5 years and 9 months (2,104 days). Its orbit has an eccentricity of 0.21 and an inclination of 21° with respect to the ecliptic. The first precovery was taken at Crimea-Simeis in 1939, extending the asteroid's observation arc by 38 years prior to its discovery.

Physical characteristics 

The carbonaceous C-type asteroid is one of the darkest main-belt asteroids known.

Rotation period 

In September 2008, a rotational lightcurve was obtained from photometric observations made by Italian astronomer Federico Manzini at the Stazione Astronomica di Sozzago, Italy. It rendered it a rotation period of  hours with a brightness variation of 0.13 in magnitude. Previously, a fragmentary lightcurve from the 1990s, gave a shorter period of 7.1 hours with an amplitude of 0.25.

Diameter and albedo 

According to the space-based surveys carried out by the Infrared Astronomical Satellite, IRAS, the Japanese Akari satellite, and NASA's Wide-field Infrared Survey Explorer with its subsequent NEOWISE mission, the asteroid's surface has an exceptionally low albedo between 0.012 and 0.051. Combined with the observation's corresponding absolute magnitude, this results in an inferred diameter of 42.9 to 64.6 kilometers. The Collaborative Asteroid Lightcurve Link derives an albedo of 0.02 and a diameter of 59.3 kilometers.

Naming 

This minor planet was named after of South American astronomer Reinaldo Augusto Carestia (1932–1993), professor of positional astronomy at UNSJ's School of Topography, publisher of 5 star catalogs, and member of the National Committee of Scientific and Technological Research of Chile. For decades, he worked with the Repsold Meridian Circle at the discovering Felix Aguilar Observatory. The official naming citation was published by the Minor Planet Center on 19 October 1994.

References

External links 
 Observatorio Astronómico Félix Aguilar – "Museo astronómico Reinaldo Carestia" (in Spanish)
 Asteroid Lightcurve Database (LCDB), query form (info )
 Dictionary of Minor Planet Names, Google books
 Asteroids and comets rotation curves, CdR – Observatoire de Genève, Raoul Behrend
 Discovery Circumstances: Numbered Minor Planets (1)-(5000) – Minor Planet Center
 
 

003578
003578
Named minor planets
19770211